is a retired Japanese naval officer who served as the 34th Chief of Staff of the Japanese Maritime Self Defence Force (JMSDF) from March 2019 to March 2022.

Career
Hiroshi Yamamura graduated from the National Defense Academy of Japan in 1984 and started his career as an electrical engineer. Yamamura served as JMSDF Deputy Chief of Staff since December 2016. His other commands included the Fleet Escort Force,  and the Escort Flotilla 4, served as the Deputy Chief of Staff for Defense Plans and Policy, Joint Staff, and as Chief of Defense Section, Defense Division, Maritime Staff Division, and serving as the captain of the JS Mineyuki. In March 2019, he became the 34th and incumbent Chief of Staff of the Japanese Maritime Self-Defense Force (JMSDF).

In April 2019 he visited China for the fleet review of the People's Liberation Army Navy, commemorating the 70th anniversary of the Chinese navy.

Timeline
March 1984: Graduated from the 28th term (electrical engineering) of the National Defense Academy, joined the Maritime Self-Defense Force
1998 (Heisei 10) July: Promoted to 2nd class Kaisa (Lieutenant Colonel)
August 1999: Chief and Deputy Chief of the escort destroyer "JS Asagiri"
August 28, 2000: Captain of the escort ship "JS Mineyuki"
August 10, 2001: Personnel Planning Division, Personnel Education Department, Maritime Staff Office
January 1, 2003: Promoted to 1st class Kaisa (Colonel)
August 30, 2004: Chief of the Defense Division, Defense Department, Maritime Staff Office
August 21, 2006: Personnel Planning Coordinator and Planning Team Leader, Personnel Planning Division, Personnel Education Department, Maritime Staff Office
July 3, 2007: Chief of Defense Division, Defense Department, Maritime Staff Office
2009 (Heisei 21)
July 21: Promoted to Rear Admiral
December 7: Commander of the Escort Flotilla 4
April 27, 2011: Deputy General Manager, General Affairs Department, Maritime Staff Office
March 30, 2012: Chief of Staff, Fleet Escort Force Command
August 22, 2013: Director of Defense Planning Department, Joint Staff Office
August 4, 2015: Promoted to sea general and appointed commander of the 37th Fleet Escort Force
December 22, 2016: Appointed as the 40th Deputy Chief of the Maritime Staff Office
April 1, 2019: Appointed as the 34th Chief of Staff, Maritime Self-Defense Force
2021 (Reiwa 3) June 1: Received the Legion of Merit from the US Government
March 30, 2022: Retired

Awards 
 Legion of Merit (Officer) 
防衛省人事発令（2011～2019）

References

External links
Message from Chief of Staff (April 2019)

Living people
1962 births
Chiefs of Staff of the Japan Maritime Self-Defense Force
National Defense Academy of Japan alumni
Military personnel from Yamaguchi Prefecture